Eothynnus salmonens is an extinct species of prehistoric jackfish that lived during the lower Eocene of what is now the Isle of Sheppey (as a part of the London Clay Lagerstatten.  It is known exclusively from some preserved skulls.

It was originally thought to be a tuna or mackerel, hence the generic name translating as "dawn" or "Eocene tuna."  Later, it was reappraised to be a jackfish, related to Teratichthys and Eastmanalepes (syn. "Caranx primaevus").

See also

 Prehistoric fish
 List of prehistoric bony fish

References

Eocene fish
Carangidae
Eocene fish of Europe